Hank Lebioda (born January 14, 1994) is an American professional golfer.

Lebioda played college golf at Florida State University, where he won two events. After his first season, Lebioda was named ACC Freshman of the Year. As a senior, he was named ACC Player of the Year. Entering college he was the 4th ranked player in Golf Worlds junior world rankings. Lebioda has battled with Crohn's disease since his senior year in high school, making his road to a professional career in golf a notable one. 

Lebioda began his professional career on the PGA Tour Canada in 2016. In 2017, he played both the PGA Tour Canada and the PGA Tour Latinoamérica. His first professional win came at PGA Tour Canada's 2017 Mackenzie Investments Open, which he won by eight shots.

Lebioda's top-10 season on the 2017 PGA Tour Latinoamérica advanced him to the finals of the Web.com Tour qualifying event. He finished tied for 30th in qualifying, which earned him his 2018 Web.com Tour card. In his rookie season, he finished the regular season 25th on the money list, earning a promotion to the PGA Tour for the 2018–19 season.

He is a graduate of Trinity Preparatory School in Winter Park, Florida.

Amateur wins
2010 Florida Junior Championship
2012 Florida Junior Championship
2014 SunTrust Gator Invitational
2016 Seminole Intercollegiate

Source:

Professional wins (1)
PGA Tour Canada wins (1)

Results in The Players Championship

"T" indicates a tie for a place

Team appearancesProfessional'
Aruba Cup (representing PGA Tour Latinoamérica): 2017

See also
2018 Web.com Tour Finals graduates
2019 Korn Ferry Tour Finals graduates

References

External links

American male golfers
Florida State Seminoles men's golfers
PGA Tour golfers
Korn Ferry Tour graduates
Left-handed golfers
Golfers from Orlando, Florida
Sportspeople from Winter Park, Florida
Trinity Preparatory School alumni
1994 births
Living people